Paul Moore (1886–1959) was an American businessman.

Biography
Moore was a son of William Henry "Judge" Moore and father of the Rt. Rev. Paul Moore and William Moore, a banker who was named Chairman of the Board of Bankers Trust after Paul Moore Sr. resigned the post. Moore was a member of the Yale Class of 1908 and earned a law degree, 1911, from New York University.

After graduating from Yale, Moore started his career in the law office of the Rock Island Railroad in Chicago. He enrolled at Northwestern University School of Law while there but returned to New York and completed law studies at NYU. During this period he married and was a director of the Lehigh Valley Coal Sales Company. During World War I he was a major with the United States Army Ordnance Corps.

Moore married Fanny Mann Hanna, a daughter of Leonard C. Hanna Jr. and niece to Mark Hanna, on October 30, 1909, in Cleveland, OH. She was a member of the Citizens Committee for Planned Parenthood of the American Birth Control League. She was also the first female director of the Episcopal Church Foundation. Paul Moore Jr. would go on to be a leader in the church as the 13th Episcopal Bishop of the New York Diocese. He was a noted liberal advocate during and after the Civil Rights era in the United States of America.

Moore consolidated the gains made by his father, "Judge" Moore, during the corporate merger or "Great Merger Movement" at the turn of the 20th century. He reorganized Seversky Aircraft to Republic Aviation in 1939, and sat on the boards of several enterprises put together by his father and uncle, James Hobart Moore, among them United States Steel, National Biscuit Company, Bankers Trust, the American Can Company, and the Delaware, Lackawanna and Western Railroad.

Palm Beach mansion
After a two-year renovation-and-restoration project, the property was listed for sale in 2018 for $58,000,000.

References

1886 births 
1959 deaths
New York University School of Law alumni
Moore family
Yale College alumni